Ivorians in France consist of migrants from Ivory Coast and their descendants living and working in France. They are one of the diasporas from Black Africa in France.

History 
Prior to 1990, immigration from the Ivory Coast to France was very limited. It was mostly students and businessmen who wanted to return to Ivory Coast. But with the economic crisis and the politic instability of their home country, many chose to remain in French banlieue and the Ivorian population increased.

Notable people

Isabelle Boni-Claverie (Author/screenwriter/film director)

Fababy (born 1988, rapper/singer/songwriter)

Laika Faten (born 1968, singer)

Christina Goh (born 1977, singer/songwriter/poet)

H Magnum (rapper)

Kaaris (born 1980, rapper/record producer/composer)

Manu Katche (born 1958, drummer/songwriter)\

Aminata Kone (lawyer/activist)

Gabriela Kouassi (born 1979, heptathlete)

Laylow (born 1993, rapper)

Jessi M'Bengue (born 1989, model/actress/singer)

Sabine Pakora (actress)
 
Karidja Toure (born 1994, actress)
 Dan-Axel Zagadou

References

Society of France
 
African diaspora in France
Immigration to France by country of origin
Ivorian diaspora